General elections were held in the Dominican Republic on 16 May 1974. The main opposition party, the Dominican Revolutionary Party, did not contest the election, leaving only the ruling Reformist Party and some right-wing and centre-right parties. Incumbent Joaquín Balaguer won the presidential election, whilst his Reformist Party won the Congressional elections in alliance with the National Youth Movement. Voter turnout was 71.7%.

Results

President

Congress

References

Dominican Republic
1974 in the Dominican Republic
Elections in the Dominican Republic
Presidential elections in the Dominican Republic
Election and referendum articles with incomplete results
May 1974 events in North America